John Angus Paul Collins (born 31 January 1968) is a Scottish professional football manager and former player who played as a midfielder.

He played for Hibernian, Celtic, AS Monaco, Everton and Fulham in a 19-year career. Collins also represented Scotland 58 times, scoring in the opening match of the 1998 FIFA World Cup against Brazil.

He started his coaching career as manager of Hibernian, winning the 2007 Scottish League Cup Final, but resigned later that year. He then had a brief spell as manager of Charleroi in 2009. Collins was appointed director of football at Livingston in February 2012, but resigned a year later. He then assisted Ronny Deila at Celtic for two years. Collins has also worked in media coverage of football.

Playing career

Hibernian
As a youngster, Collins played both rugby union and football before turning his attention entirely to football. At youth level, he played for Hutchison Vale between 1980 and 1984, captaining the side for four years, before signing as a professional with Hibernian. Collins played with the Hibees for six seasons, making his debut in 1985 aged 17, appearing 195 times and scoring 21 goals. During his spell at Easter Road, he was named the PFA Scotland Young Player of the Year for 1988.

Celtic
Collins signed for Celtic in 1990, becoming their first million pound player. He generally played on the left side of midfield, scoring 55 goals in 273 appearances. In April 1994, he became the first professional footballer using Adidas Predator boots to score a goal in a top-level match: he scored the opening goal of a 1–1 draw at Ibrox against Rangers, direct from a free-kick on the edge of the penalty box. He repeated that feat from almost the same position in the next Old Firm meeting at the same venue in August of the same year. During his time at Celtic he won only one trophy; the Scottish Cup in 1995.

Monaco
Collins moved to AS Monaco in the summer of 1996 on a free transfer under the Bosman ruling; Under the direction of Fergus McCann, Celtic attempted to obtain compensation for the loss of Collins, arguing that the Bosman ruling did not apply to this case because AS Monaco were based in the principality of Monaco and outside of European Union jurisdiction. The compensation claim was not successful.

Collins won the French championship in 1997 with Monaco, who then reached the semi-final of the 1997–98 UEFA Champions League, defeating Manchester United in the quarter-final before losing to Juventus.

Later career
Collins moved to Everton in the summer of 1998 for £2 million. He captained Everton before submitting a transfer request in 2000. He then joined Fulham, where he linked up with Jean Tigana, who had been his manager at Monaco. Collins helped Fulham gain promotion to the Premier League in 2001. He retired in 2003, having not played regularly during the 2002–03 season. Coventry City offered to sign Collins on loan, but this offer was refused by Fulham because it did not cover his wages fully.

In February 2014, Collins registered as a player with Gala Fairydean Rovers, a club who he had been ambassador for.

International
Collins won 58 caps and scored 12 goals for Scotland. He played for his country at Euro 1996 and the 1998 World Cup. He scored a goal in the opening match of that World Cup, with a penalty kick against Brazil. He retired from international football after the aggregate defeat in the UEFA Euro 2000 qualifying play-offs by England in November 1999.

Coaching career
After retiring from club football in 2003, Collins spent time in Monaco with his family, while also obtaining coaching qualifications including the UEFA Pro Licence.

On 31 October 2006, Collins was appointed as manager of Hibernian. Collins led Hibernian to their first national trophy in over 15 years, when they defeated Kilmarnock 5–1 in the 2007 Scottish League Cup Final. Despite the League Cup victory, Collins had a major dispute with his players just weeks later. A delegation of players met chairman Rod Petrie, where they complained about his training methods and match tactics. The players soon backed down and captain Rob Jones offered a public apology to Collins on their behalf.

On 20 December 2007, Collins resigned from Hibernian with immediate effect, citing a disagreement with the Hibs board about the budget to bring in new players. His decision was taken just one day after the club opened new training facilities. Collins had also said in October 2007 that he had "no intention" of breaking his contract with Hibs, after turning down a possibility of becoming Queens Park Rangers manager.

Lawrie Sanchez was sacked by Fulham the next day, which led to reports that Collins might move there. Collins distanced himself from this speculation, and Roy Hodgson was appointed by Fulham a week later. Collins was interviewed by West Ham United in September 2008.

On 15 December 2008, Collins was appointed as the manager of Belgian club Charleroi. Collins was reunited with former Hibs striker Abdessalam Benjelloun, but Benjelloun was almost immediately returned to Hibs before being loaned to another Belgian club, Roeselare. Collins announced his departure from Charleroi after the club secured their First Division status near the end of the season.

Collins was appointed director of football by Livingston in February 2012. He agreed to play for his old amateur club Gala Rovers in a friendly against a Livingston XI on 25 July 2012. He left the club on 28 February 2013, after Collins disagreed with a decision to remove Gareth Evans from first team coaching.

In June 2014, Collins was appointed to the position of assistant manager at Celtic. He left the club at the end of the 2015–16 season, at the same time as Deila.

Media work
Collins has appeared on the Sky Sports coverage of the UEFA Champions League and Sportscene's coverage of Scotland games. He worked for CBC Sports during their coverage of the 2010 FIFA World Cup.

Career statistics

International

Scores and results list Scotland's goal tally first, score column indicates score after each Collins goal.

Managerial record

Honours

Player
Celtic
Scottish Cup: 1995

Monaco
Ligue 1: 1997

Fulham
Football League Championship: 2000–01
UEFA Intertoto Cup: 2002

Manager
Hibernian
Scottish League Cup: 2007

Individual
Scotland national football team roll of honour : 1998

References

External links
 
 
 

1968 births
1990 FIFA World Cup players
1998 FIFA World Cup players
AS Monaco FC players
Association football midfielders
Celtic F.C. non-playing staff
Celtic F.C. players
Everton F.C. players
Expatriate football managers in Belgium
Expatriate footballers in France
Expatriate footballers in Monaco
Fulham F.C. players
Gala Fairydean Rovers F.C. players
Hibernian F.C. managers
Hibernian F.C. players
Ligue 1 players
Living people
Livingston F.C. non-playing staff
People educated at Galashiels Academy
People from Galashiels
Premier League players
R. Charleroi S.C. managers
Scotland international footballers
Scotland under-21 international footballers
Scottish expatriate footballers
Scottish expatriate sportspeople in France
Scottish expatriate sportspeople in Monaco
Scottish Football League players
Scottish football managers
Scottish expatriate football managers
Scottish footballers
Scottish Premier League managers
Sportspeople from the Scottish Borders
English Football League players
UEFA Euro 1996 players
Lothian Thistle Hutchison Vale F.C. players